The ninth season of Saturday Night Live, an American sketch comedy series, originally aired in the United States on NBC between October 8, 1983, and May 12, 1984.

Format changes
Dick Ebersol had taken Brad Hall off Weekend Update (known as Saturday Night News during this time) mid-season. The segment then had a revolving door of other anchors mostly involving the episode's host and, in one case, Joe Piscopo (although Piscopo only introduced a commentary and didn't tell any actual jokes).

Hosts
Future cast member Billy Crystal hosted twice this season: once with musical guest Al Jarreau and again on the season finale with Ed Koch, Edwin Newman, Betty Thomas and former cast member Don Novello, with The Cars as musical guest.

Cast
Before the start of the season, the entire cast returned for another season. The only change was the hiring (and firing, then rehiring) of Jim Belushi. Belushi became the first person to be hired then fired then rehired, future cast member Chris Parnell will later become the second. Eddie Murphy left the program two episodes before the end of the season. When the season ended, Robin Duke, Brad Hall, Tim Kazurinsky and Joe Piscopo left the show.

Cast roster
Repertory players
Jim Belushi (first episode: October 22, 1983)
Robin Duke
Mary Gross
Brad Hall
Tim Kazurinsky
Gary Kroeger
Julia Louis-Dreyfus
Eddie Murphy (final episode: February 25, 1984)
Joe Piscopo
bold denotes Weekend Update anchor

Writers

This season's writers were Jim Belushi, Andy Breckman, Robin Duke, Adam Green, Mary Gross, Nate Herman, Tim Kazurinsky, Kevin Kelton, Andy Kurtzman, Michael McCarthy, Eddie Murphy, Pamela Norris, Margaret Oberman, Joe Piscopo, Andrew Smith, Bob Tischler, Eliot Wald and Herb Sargent. The head writers were Bob Tischler and Andrew Smith.

Episodes

References

09
1983 American television seasons
1984 American television seasons
Saturday Night Live in the 1980s